Straight University, after 1915 Straight College, was a historically black college that operated between 1868 and 1934 in New Orleans, Louisiana. After struggling with financial difficulties, it was merged with New Orleans University to form Dillard University.

History
Responding to the post-Civil War need to educate newly freed African Americans in New Orleans, Louisiana and the surrounding region, the American Missionary Association of the Congregational Church founded Straight University on June 12, 1868.

Straight University received its name as recognition for Seymour Straight's initial endowment gift. Straight was a wealthy cheese manufacturer from Hudson, Ohio. In 1915, the name "Straight University" was changed to Straight College, which more accurately represented the scope of the school's curriculum and program. Missionary work was a core concern, which extended from New Orleans to Africa.

It was a college that admitted students regardless of their backgrounds, advertising in 1871:The old and young can enter at this Institution any day, no distinction made in regard to race or color. The design of the Institution, is to furnish opportunities to those wishing a rapid, thorough and practical business education [...]. Parties having ordinary ability, who have entirely neglected their education now have the opportunity to qualify themselves for almost any position in the State, in an incredible short time. From two to three months is all that requires to complete the commeral [sic] course. Terms duced to suit the times [sic].Throughout its history, Straight offered courses of study ranging from elementary- to college-level courses in music and theology. In 1934, after struggling with financial difficulties during the Great Depression, Straight College was merged with New Orleans University to form Dillard University.

Law department
Straight University also offered professional training, including a law department from 1874 to 1886. Its graduates participated in local and national Reconstruction and post-Reconstruction era civil rights struggles. For example, Louis André Martinet, an 1876 graduate of Straight University Law School, published The Crusader—a civil rights daily; co-founded the Comité des Citoyens (Citizens' Committee) in New Orleans, which worked for civil rights; and played a significant role in setting up the challenge to segregation of Plessy v. Ferguson, a landmark Supreme Court case. His classmate Dan Desdunes joined him in this effort before moving to North Omaha, Nebraska to become a notable band leader.

The Law department is historically notable as an integrated institution where blacks and whites were trained side by side. "It is an interesting fact of our 50 law graduates, 35 have been white." The school struggled to provide its law students with a proper research library. The students typically met for classes in the law professors' offices.

In 1886, Straight discontinued the Law Department. It began to focus primarily on liberal arts, industrial arts, and teacher training.

Campus
The campus faced Canal Street, occupying the block between Tonti and Rocheblave streets backed by Gasquet (now Cleveland Avenue). After the university was merged with the newly created Dillard University, the campus buildings served as a school and YWCA for nearly two decades. They were demolished in 1950.

Notable alumni

Some graduates brought education and medical care to African Americans during the early part of the 20th century. Physician James W. Ames, for example, founded the first hospital for blacks in Detroit in 1910. He created Dunbar Hospital for physicians and patients of color, as they were unable to practice in or be admitted to Detroit hospitals operated by whites.

Nellie A. Ramsey Leslie became a pioneer teacher in Indian Territory and later in Texas.

Other notable alumni include Tom Yarborough, the first Black mayor in California, P.B.S. Pinchback (first African-American governor of Louisiana and of any U.S. state); Ernest Lyon (educator and U.S. Ambassador to Liberia); Mary Booze (first African American to sit on the Republican National Committee, serving from Mississippi from 1924 to 1948); Alice Dunbar Nelson, forerunner of the Harlem Renaissance; and Theodore K. Lawless (dermatologist and philanthropist).

See also
 Storer College

Notes
 Laborde & Magill (2006). "Canal Street: New Orleans' great wide way".

External links
Straight University and Professor H.H. Swain Collection at The Historic New Orleans Collection

 
Educational institutions established in 1868
Universities and colleges in New Orleans
Defunct private universities and colleges in Louisiana
Educational institutions disestablished in 1934
Dillard University
1868 establishments in Louisiana
1934 disestablishments in Louisiana